Obory  is a village in the administrative district of Gmina Zbójno, within Golub-Dobrzyń County, Kuyavian-Pomeranian Voivodeship, in north-central Poland.

The village has a population of 211. It is well known as the sanctuary of the Patroness of Dobrzyń Land with the miraculous statue of Our Lady of Sorrows crowned officially in 1976.

References

Villages in Golub-Dobrzyń County
Religious buildings and structures in Poland